Choy Tsz To (born 4 September 1999) is a Hong Kong professional footballer who plays as a goalkeeper for Hong Kong Premier League club Southern.

Club career

Southern
On 30 August 2017, Choy joined Southern.

References

External links
HKFA

Hong Kong footballers
Hong Kong First Division League players
Hong Kong Premier League players
Association football goalkeepers
Resources Capital FC players
Southern District FC players
1999 births
Living people